The Ministry of Economic and Business Affairs is a ministry in the Danish government.

The Ministry was created in 2001 as a merger between the Ministry of Economic Affairs and the Ministry of Trade and Industry.

Since its creation, the Minister of Economic and Business Affairs has usually been the Deputy Prime Minister, and the leader of the second largest party in the government coalition. Since 2 September 2014 Morten Østergaard of the Danish Social Liberal Party is minister.

Economic and Business Affairs